DHL Hometown Heroes was a 2006 promotional event, sponsored by shipping company DHL, where Major League Baseball (MLB) fans were encouraged to vote for the most outstanding player in the history of each MLB franchise.

Fans were asked to vote for the most outstanding player in the history of each MLB franchise, based on on-field performance, leadership quality and character value. The candidates for the ballot were chosen by the clubs themselves, in conjunction with a blue-ribbon panel of baseball experts, journalists, and historians. The award winners were then chosen, over two months of voting, in a process similar to MLB all-star voting.  Votes were cast by fans at every MLB ballpark, as well as online and via cell-phone. In all, nearly 17 million votes were cast.

On September 27, 2006 MLB announced a list of winning players, one from each team.

Of the players awarded, Nolan Ryan was the only player to win the award for two different teams: the Houston Astros and the Texas Rangers.

Three of the honored players were true "hometown heroes" in the sense of starring with MLB teams in or near their actual hometowns. Ryan grew up from infancy in the Houston suburb of Alvin, Texas. Cal Ripken Jr., chosen by Baltimore Orioles fans, was born in Havre de Grace and grew up in Aberdeen, towns in Harford County, Maryland within 45 minutes' drive of Baltimore. Pete Rose, chosen by Cincinnati Reds fans, was born and raised in Cincinnati. (Note that although Jackie Robinson, selected by Los Angeles Dodgers fans, grew up in Pasadena, California, he never played for the franchise in Los Angeles. His entire MLB career was with the Brooklyn Dodgers.)

Award winners

The "Hometown Heroes" panel
 Orestes Destrade (ESPN and XM Satellite Radio broadcaster)
 Steve Hirdt (Elias Sports Bureau Executive Vice President)
 Jerome Holtzman (Hall of Fame writers wing official MLB historian)
 Richard C. Levin (Yale University president)
 Dinn Mann (MLB.com editor-in-chief)
 Tim McCarver (Fox Sports broadcaster)
 Jose de Jesus Ortiz (Houston Chronicle writer)
 Harold Reynolds (ESPN broadcaster)
 Ken Shouler (historian and author)
 Claire Smith (The Philadelphia Inquirer assistant sports editor)
 Don Sutton (Washington Nationals broadcaster and Hall of Fame pitcher)

See also

 Baseball awards
 List of Major League Baseball awards

Notes

References

External links
 DHL Presents Major League Baseball Hometown Heroes (2006) imdb.com
 Five 'All-Century' players not included Ken Shouler ESPN.com

Major League Baseball trophies and awards
History of Major League Baseball
DHL